Ray Brown with the All-Star Big Band is a 1962 album by the jazz double bassist Ray Brown accompanied by a big band featuring the alto saxophonist Cannonball Adderley.

Track listing 
 "Work Song" (Nat Adderley) – 5:17
 "It Happened in Monterey" (Billy Rose, Mabel Wayne) – 3:06
 "My One and Only Love" (Robert Mellin, Guy Wood) – 3:56
 "Tricrotism" (Oscar Pettiford) – 3:54
 "Thumbstring" (Ray Brown) – 4:42
 "Cannon Bilt" (Brown) – 3:34
 "Two for the Blues" (Neal Hefti, Jon Hendricks) – 4:07
 "Day In, Day Out" (Rube Bloom, Johnny Mercer) – 2:49
 "Baubles, Bangles, & Beads" (Robert Wright, George Forrest) – 3:29

Personnel 
Ray Brown – double bass, cello
Cannonball Adderley – alto saxophone
Sam Jones – double bass
Budd Johnson, Earle Warren, Jerome Richardson, Seldon Powell, Yusef Lateef – woodwind
Britt Woodman, Jimmy Cleveland, Melba Liston, Paul Faulise – trombone
Clark Terry, Ernie Royal, Joe Newman, Nat Adderley – trumpet
Tommy Flanagan – piano
Osie Johnson – drums
Al Cohn – arranger
Ernie Wilkins – arranger, conductor
Ray Hall – engineer
Burt Goldblatt, Chuck Stewart – photography
Jim Davis – producer

References

1962 albums
Albums arranged by Al Cohn
Albums arranged by Ernie Wilkins
Ray Brown (musician) albums
Verve Records albums